The Stealers of Dreams is a BBC Books original novel written by Steve Lyons and based on the long-running British science fiction television series Doctor Who. It was published on 8 September 2005 alongside The Deviant Strain and Only Human. It features the Ninth Doctor, Rose Tyler and Captain Jack. To date, this is the last original novel to feature the Ninth Doctor.

Plot
The Doctor, Rose, and Captain Jack are on another world, in the year 2775 (Rose's future), where the chips are not quite the same. There are poster-like TV screens everywhere, but the Doctor says the technology is twenty-seventh century, or earlier.  The city is growing up, instead of out, while 90% of the planet is jungle.

The three of them rent a room for the night, and are given three tablets 'to stop you dreaming.'  As Rose flips through the channels of the obligatory TV, all she finds are news and documentaries.  'All factual programmes.  There's no escapism.  No imagination.  Nothing that tells a story.'  'No lies.'  'No fiction.' ... 'No wonder this world is stagnated.'

The Doctor sees an arrest of 'fiction geeks' in progress on the news and goes to see what he can find out.  He tells Officer Waller that he is an inspector with the government, and shows her his psychic paper as proof.  She tells him that the planet has no government, and he quickly changes his story to being a researcher for one of the news channels and shows her the psychic paper again.

Waller gets a call that Hal Gryden is broadcasting with an approximate location, and the Doctor rides along.  As they drive, she explains that on the last call, the police were chasing fantasists who were exchanging comic books. At the last moment, the broadcast signal was lost.

Back in the hotel room, Rose hears footsteps in the hall.  She goes out to look, and hears a noise come from the cleaner's store cupboard.  She opens the door to find a skinny guy about her age, who tries to hide the papers he is holding.  He tells her the cops are after him because of the fiction.  She says she doesn't care, and takes him back to their room.  He says his name is Domnic.

In the room, Domnic starts messing with the TV tuning, while Rose looks at the papers he brought.  Part of it is a cartoon with a woman who is being chased by zombies.  He tells them that he is looking for Static, an unlicensed TV station run by Hal Gryden.  Rose fills in Jack about fiction being against the law, and Domnic tells them that people are sent to a Home for the Cognitively Disconnected, with the main one being called the Big White House.

Suddenly Domnic gets scared and thinks that Rose and Jack are actually the police and runs for the door.  When Rose stops him, he jumps out the window and manages to catch the fire-escape cage and get away safely.

The radio tells Waller of another disturbance, where a man is threatening a group of bankers.  The Doctor starts talking to him, then Waller takes over and he is arrested and taken to the Big White House.

Jack leaves Rose sleeping in the hotel room to see what he can find out about Hal Gryden.  He meets a tramp, and they go to a nearby pub.  Jack decides the best way to find Gryden is to go out and tell stories, so Gryden will come to him.  In the first bar, no one wants to listen, and in the second, the bartender throws them out.  But most of the people in the third are interested, even though he is heckled by others accusing him of spreading fiction.

Suddenly, the tramp tells Jack that they have to move on.  At other pubs, they are starting to be recognized on sight.  At the last one, they stay just a bit too long, and are almost caught by the police.  They manage to escape and find a hiding place, and the tramp tells Jack that he's Hal Gryden.

Rose wakes to hear the end of an editorial broadcast by Static TV, and that a story about zombies is promised for the afternoon.  The Doctor is still not back, so she leaves him a note.  She and Jack decide that Domnic can be useful to them, so she is going to look for him.  As she is headed out the door, she thinks maybe she heard a footstep behind her, and maybe she has seen a zombie, but decides it must be a leftover dream.

From the research they'd done online the night before, finding his flat is easy, but no one answers Rose's knock.  She is trudging back to the hotel room when he leaps out at her from behind a table in a cafe.  He says that the police are watching his flat, and they start walking.  Rose thinks she sees another zombie, and they both start running, but Domnic says he thinks he has seen a policewoman.

Rose and Domnic find their way into a builder's yard.  Rose thinks at first that they should go into the building, but then sees a glimpse of a zombie in a window, and then the gate closes loudly.  Suddenly they are surrounded by zombies.

The Doctor is at the Big White House with Officer Waller and meets the duty nurse Cal Tyko.  They follow him on his rounds and see some of the patients.  He won't allow them to view the operating theatres.  The man who was arrested earlier is brought in, put in a padded cell, and given an injection to shut down the right hemisphere of his brain.  Tyko says 'We've good reason to be afraid of the big bad wolf.'  The Doctor heads back to the hotel by himself and hopes that neither Jack nor Rose have done anything unwise while he has been gone.

Jack waits in hiding for a long time for Hal Gryden to return; he finally does, and they head off toward one of his secret studios.  They enter an old warehouse building, and find the basement is full of boxes of toys.  As they make their way upstairs, the police find them.  They reach the floor where the studio should be, find nothing, and Jack realizes that the man is just a tramp, and not really Gryden.  They are both arrested and taken to the Big White House.

Domnic tries to tell Rose that there is nothing there, no zombies, but she doesn't believe him.  Suddenly Rose sees the Doctor, and starts up the metal stairs outside the building, dragging Domnic with her.  Domnic doesn't see the Doctor, and believes that Rose is 'fantasy-crazy' when she explains about him and the TARDIS.  She uses her superphone to call her mum, who is upset with her for being in Cardiff with Mickey and not coming home for a visit.  After the call ends, Rose realizes the zombies aren't real, and decides to head back to the hotel.

At the hotel, the note that Rose left is still there, untouched.  Domnic starts flipping through the TV channels, and they hear many mentions of Hal Gryden.  Domnic says this has never happened before - everyone knows who he is, but he's never been officially named anywhere.  Rose leaves the room, and Domnic becomes absorbed in the Static channel.  The Doctor interrupts him to ask where Rose and Jack are, and Domnic doesn't know, but they find a note from Rose to him saying that she had gone with the Doctor.

At the Big White House, Jack decides to act the model inmate.  Nurse Tyko is in charge of Jack's admission, but all of the reception cells are full.  Jack tells him that the irregular black shape resembling a spaceship is a Rorschach inkblot test, and that the next is also.  He is deemed non-violent and sent to Common Room B until he can be formally admitted.

When Jack is brought up to an office and interviewed, he gives factual responses.  Tyko determines that Jack is not 'fantasy crazy' but that his storytelling was committed with premeditated malicious intent. This means that he cannot be helped through normal methods, and they are going to perform immediate surgery to stop him from doing it again.

Rose is in a taxi, stuck in traffic, on her way to the Big White House.  The Doctor is with her, but other people don't seem to acknowledge him, the psychic paper isn't working, and the power pack of the sonic screwdriver is in need of charging.  They attempt to climb the wall, but are unsuccessful, so they go in the front gate, pretending that the Doctor is a new patient.  Once inside the walls, they sneak into a side wing.  They are seen, and orderlies take off after both of them, capturing Rose, with the Doctor telling her that he's invisible.

The Doctor goes to find Rose, and asks Domnic if he wants to come.  They first go to the TARDIS, through the console room, down some corridors and eventually end up in a small round room.  He examines Domnic, and finds that there are microorganisms in this world that weren't previously detected.

Jack is secured to a cold metal trolley and taken down to the ground floor.  Just as the surgeon is about to begin operating, there is a shriek of alarm from outside the room, the orderlies leave, and Jack manages to get free and escape.  He takes several key cards and goes back the way he'd come.  He sees them taking Rose to a room, and follows.

Jack uses a card to enter her room, but Rose thinks Jack is imaginary.  She believes he is real when he gives the full title of the Jagrafess.  The drugs they gave her are wearing off, so the two of them take the key cards and start letting the patients out.

There is rioting all over the city.  Officer Waller arrives at the Big White House and finds Captain Jack in charge inside.  He flusters her, as his 'demands' aren't typical.  Then the Doctor is there, and asks to talk to him, go into the building and try to help.

Once the Doctor gets inside, Jack fills him in on what's happening.  Rose is in a room, still unsure of herself.  The Doctor tells her about the microorganisms, how they feed off electrical activity, and seem to just love the neuroelectro-chemical signals put out by the right side of adult human brains.  They create a feedback loop, which passes to the left side and causes a person to become 'fantasy-crazy.' He tells her that now that she understands what is happening, she should be able to fight off the effect.

The Doctor hacks into an unused government emergency server, and tells Domnic to find a camera.  He is planning to cut into all the channels at once and pretend to be Hal Gryden.  The people will then be using the left side of their brains to remember a real person, and things should calm down.  The only problem is that the police will storm the building as soon as they see what's happening.  Jack says they can give him ten minutes.

The Doctor starts his broadcast, and the police head for the building.  All of the patients who are able are placed on various floors to keep the police away from the Doctor for as long as possible.  He is able to speak for about eight minutes before being arrested with everyone else.

The Doctor's speech calms things down on the streets.  He had given nurse Tyko the proof of the microorganisms, and the scientists on the planet go to work to find a way to prevent them from causing problems.  They find one a fortnight later. Jack and Rose are released from the Big White House almost immediately, and 'Hal Gryden' disappears one night before they can decide what to do with him. The colonists discover that the planet’s name is in fact Arkannis Major, which doesn't really mean much of anything. Fantasy and fiction become more commonplace as people learn to tell the difference. Eventually a new science-fiction programme appears on the colony’s new media networks — the adventures of a mysterious traveller in time and space, known only as Hal Gryden.

Continuity
The novel contains a reference to the events of the episode "Boom Town", thereby placing it after that adventure, although this creates some discontinuity with the TV series, as the episode "Bad Wolf" indicates a visit to the planet of the Slitheen occurred immediately after "Boom Town", followed by an adventure in Japan leading into the events of "Bad Wolf", leaving no apparent gap in which this novel could occur. The Doctor Who Reference Guide website posits that there may have been an undisclosed gap prior to the Japan trip.
Rose says to Jack (speaking about the Doctor) 'He's a bit of a Dickens nerd' a reference to "The Unquiet Dead".

References to popular culture
Dominic tells Jack and Rose about a script being found, that the experts think was written by Shakespeare, about a kid who goes to a school for wizards. This is probably meant to be Harry Potter. Harry Potter is mentioned again in the 2007 episode "The Shakespeare Code".

See also

Whoniverse

References

External links

The Cloister Library - The Stealers of Dreams

2005 British novels
2005 science fiction novels
Ninth Doctor novels
Novels by Steve Lyons
Novels set on fictional planets